The following highways are numbered 684:

United States